Stone Cold Rhymin' is the debut album by the American rapper Young MC. It was released in 1989 on Delicious Vinyl and was later re-issued by Rhino Records. The album reached No. 9 on the Billboard Top Pop Albums chart. The third track, "Bust a Move", was Young MC's biggest hit and is his best-known song, reaching No. 7 on the Billboard Hot 100 and topping the charts in Australia. His follow-up single, "Principal's Office", reached No. 33 on the Billboard Hot 100 and was also nominated for "Best Rap Video" at the 1990 MTV Video Music Awards.

Track listing
All tracks composed by Marvin Young, Matt Dike, and Michael Ross except where otherwise noted. All tracks published by PolyGram Music except "Just Say No" published by PolyGram/Warner Chappell.

 "I Come Off" (feat. N'Dea Davenport)
 "Principal's Office"
 "Bust a Move"
 "Non Stop"
 "Fastest Rhyme" (M. Young)
 "My Name is Young" (M. Young/M. Dike)
 "Know How" (M. Young/John "King Gizmo" King/Michael "E.Z. Mike" Simpson)
 "Roll with the Punches"
 "I Let 'Em Know"
 "Pick Up the Pace" (M. Young/M. Dike)
 "Got More Rhymes" (M. Young/M. Dike/M. Ross/J. King)
 "Stone Cold Buggin'" (M. Young/M. Dike)
 "Just Say No" (M. Young/Quincy Jones Jr.)

Personnel
Young MC – vocals, songwriting
Matt Dike – production, arrangement, mixing (all tracks except 7 and 13)
Michael Ross – production, arrangement, mixing (all tracks except 7 and 13)
The Dust Brothers – production, arrangement, mixing (track 7), co-production (track 11)
Quincy Jones Jr. – production, arrangement, mixing (track 13)
Mario Caldato Jr. – engineering
Brian Foxworthy – additional engineering
Salomon – photography, art direction
EMC-0 – production coordinator
Crystal Blake – vocals (tracks 1, 3 and 11)
Flea – bass (tracks 2 and 3)
Kevin O'Neal – bass (tracks 7 and 8)
John Dexter Steward Jr. – drums (tracks 2 and 4)

Charts

References

1989 debut albums
Albums produced by Quincy Jones
Albums produced by the Dust Brothers
Delicious Vinyl albums
Young MC albums